Catocala laura is a moth in the family Erebidae. It is found in Tajikistan.

References

laura
Moths described in 2008
Moths of Asia